Mitta may refer to:

Alexander Mitta (born 1933), Soviet and Russian film director
Mitta, an old Anglo-Saxon measure of capacity
Mitta River, major tributary of the Murray River in Victoria, Australia
Mitta United Football Club, Australian Rules Football club in Mitta Mitta, Victoria

See also
Mitta Mitta (disambiguation)